The Château de Gannat is a castle in the town of Gannat in the Allier département of France. The castle now houses a museum known as Musée Yves Machelon.

Description
With origins in the 12th century, the Château de Gannat is a typical 14th century defensive castle, built on a square plan flanked with four machicolated towers, linked by high crenellated walls.  Originally, the castle was outside the town walls and surrounded by water; it is now a feature of the town centre. By the 16th century it was uninhabitable. and much of it was dismantled in 1566. On the east wall are traces of a fireplace and two vaulted bays.

It was used as a prison from 1833 to the early 20th century.

The property of the département, the Château de Gannat has been listed since 1926 by the French Ministry of Culture as a monument historique.

Museum
The museum is housed in the former prison warders' apartments and the cells. Items on display include 14th to 18th century parchments from the town's archives, a 17th-century ivory crucifix and 12th century wrought iron. A prize exhibit is a Gospel book, whose binding is even older (10th century). Other exhibits include a typical Bourbonnais kitchen, clog makers workshop, leather and farming tools. A separate section on the French Resistance displays photographs, medals and news articles about the Resistance in the local area.

See also
List of castles in France

References

External links
 
 Musée Yves Machelon  Musée Yves Machelon 

Castles in Auvergne-Rhône-Alpes
Defunct prisons in France
Monuments historiques of Allier
Museums in Allier
Local museums in France